The following are lists of notable steakhouses.

Chain restaurant steakhouses

North America

 Black Angus
 Bonanza Steakhouse
 The Capital Grille
 Charlie Brown's Steakhouse
 Claim Jumper
 Del Frisco's Double Eagle Steak House
 Doe's Eat Place
 Fleming's Prime Steakhouse & Wine Bar
 Fogo de Chão
 Harry Caray's Italian Steakhouse
 Hoss's Steak and Sea House
 Houston's Restaurant
 K-Bob's Steakhouse
 The Keg
 Lawry's
 Logan's Roadhouse
 Lone Star Steakhouse & Saloon (defunct)
 LongHorn Steakhouse
 Montana Mike's
 Morton's The Steakhouse
 Mr. Steak
 Outback Steakhouse
 The Palm
 Ponderosa Steakhouse
 Quaker Steak & Lube
 Rodizio Grill
 Rustler Steak House
 Ruth's Chris Steak House
 Saltgrass Steak House
 Sirloin Stockade
 Sizzler
 Smith & Wollensky
 Steak and Ale Restaurant
 Stoney River Legendary Steaks
 Strip House
 Tahoe Joe's
 Taste of Texas
 Texas de Brazil
 Texas Land and Cattle
 Texas Roadhouse
 Timber Lodge Steakhouse
 Valle's Steak House (defunct)
 Victoria Station (defunct)
 Western Sizzlin'
 Wolfgang's Steakhouse
 York Steak House (defunct)

Outside North America

 Berni Inn (defunct) - United Kingdom
 Block House - Germany
 Buffalo Grill - France
 L'Entrecôte - France
 A Hereford Beefstouw - Scandinavia
 Hog's Breath Cafe - Australia
 Maredo - Germany
 Papagaio - Israel
 Ribera Steakhouse - Japan
 Relais de l'Entrecôte - France
 Relais de Venise - London, Bahrain, and New York City

Independent restaurants 

 Barberian's Steak House - Toronto
 Barclay Prime - Philadelphia
 Bear Creek Saloon and Steakhouse - Bear Creek, Montana
 Bern's Steak House - Tampa, Florida
 The Big Texan Steak Ranch - Amarillo, Texas
 Bobcat Bite - Santa Fe, New Mexico
 Brasserie Les Halles - New York City
 Cattleman Restaurant (defunct) - New York City
 Clyde's Prime Rib, Portland, Oregon
 Country Bill's - Portland, Oregon
 Delmonico's - New York City
 Gallagher's Steak House - New York City
 Golden Ox - Kansas City, Missouri
 Gorat's - Omaha, Nebraska
 Hilltop Steak House (defunct) - Saugus, Massachusetts 
 The Hitching Post - California
 Jess & Jim's Steakhouse - Kansas City, Missouri
 Joule – Seattle
 Keens Steakhouse - New York City
 Mitchell's Steakhouse - Columbus, Ohio
 Moishes Steakhouse - Montreal, Quebec, Canada
 Old Homestead Steakhouse - New York City
 Pearl Tavern - Portland, Oregon
 Peter Luger Steak House - New York City
 The Pine Club - Dayton, Ohio
 Porter House New York - New York City
 RingSide Steakhouse - Portland, Oregon
 Sayler's Old Country Kitchen, Portland, Oregon
 Sparks Steak House - New York City
 St. Elmo Steak House - Indianapolis, Indiana
 Timber Lodge Steakhouse - Minnesota
 The Willo Steakhouse - California

Steakhouses
Steakhouses